Sensorium Corporation is a social virtual reality (VR) company registered in the Cayman Islands with offices in Los Angeles, California; Zurich, Switzerland; London, United Kingdom; and Moscow, Russia.

Overview 
The initial prototype of Sensorium Galaxy platform was introduced at the Electronics Entertainment Expo (E3) in June 2019.

Conceptually, Sensorium Galaxy is a virtual alternate universe consisting of multiple “worlds”. Each world acts as a hub for a specific type of content, such as music concerts, dance shows, art exhibitions, and masterclasses. 

The platform works under a free-to-play model, which allows users to join activities without mandatory payments. Users will purchase visual items and effects to customize their avatars as well as tickets to exclusive events. Sensorium Galaxy will be accessible via VR headsets, mobile devices, and PCs.

History 
Sensorium Corporation was founded in 2018 by billionaire Mikhail Prokhorov, former owner of the Brooklyn Nets. The company developed Sensorium Galaxy, a social virtual reality platform that incorporates social communication tools, graphics, avatars powered by artificial intelligence, and content produced by partner artists and media companies. 

Epic Games is a Sensorium partner whose 3D creation tool, Unreal Engine, is used in the Sensorium Galaxy platform. 

Sensorium Corporation has raised over $100 million in private investments since its foundation. The platform is scheduled for public launch in the first half of 2021.

In April 2020 Yann Pissenem, co-founder of Ushuaïa Ibiza and Hï Ibiza nightclubs, entered into a partnership with Sensorium Corporation to develop artist collaborations for PRISM, a thematic world in Sensorium Galaxy dedicated to electronic music events. Sensorium also signed an agreement with London-based creative studio High Scream to develop the visual concept.

In September 2020, Sensorium Corporation announced DJ David Guetta joined Sensorium Galaxy to host his performances.

In October 2020 British house and techno record producer and DJ Carl Cox confirmed a collaboration with Sensorium Galaxy to create a series of VR-based DJ sets.

Dutch DJ and producer Armin van Buuren announced a series of performances in Sensorium Galaxy.

References 

Offshore companies of the Cayman Islands
Technology companies established in 2018
Entertainment companies established in 2018
Virtual reality companies
Virtual reality communities
Computer-related introductions in 2019